California's 15th State Assembly district is one of 80 California State Assembly districts. It is currently represented by Democrat Buffy Wicks of Oakland.

District profile 
The district encompasses the northern coastal East Bay, occupying a narrow strip between the shores of San Francisco and San Pablo Bays and  the Berkeley Hills. The district is centered on Berkeley and Richmond, along with a sizable portion of Oakland.

Alameda County – 15.3%
 Albany
 Berkeley
 Emeryville
 Oakland – 20.4%
 Piedmont

Contra Costa County – 22.6%
 El Cerrito
 Hercules
 Pinole
 Richmond
 San Pablo
 El Sobrante
 Kensington

Election results from statewide races

List of Assembly Members 
Due to redistricting, the 15th district has been moved around different parts of the state. The current iteration resulted from the 2011 redistricting by the California Citizens Redistricting Commission.

Election results 1992 - present

2020

2018

2016

2014

2012

2010

2008

2006

2004

2002

2000

1998

1996

1994

1992

See also 
 California State Assembly
 California State Assembly districts
 Districts in California

References

External links 
 District map from the California Citizens Redistricting Commission

15
Government of Alameda County, California
Government of Contra Costa County, California
Albany, California
Government of Berkeley, California
Berkeley Hills
Emeryville, California
Oakland, California
Piedmont, California
El Cerrito, California
Pinole, California
Richmond, California
San Pablo, California
Government in the San Francisco Bay Area